Seán Fortune (20 December 1953 – 13 March 1999) was a Catholic priest from Ireland, and child molester, who allegedly used his position to gain access to his victims. He was accused of the rape and sexual molestation of 29 different boys. He  died by suicide while awaiting trial.

Life
Born on 20 December 1953 in Gorey, County Wexford, Fortune was the eldest son of Elizabeth (née Acton) and James Fortune. He was educated at St Peter's College, Wexford, which was the diocesan seminary of the diocese of Ferns. It was during his training that the first reports of his abuse were made, although it is not clear whether the Diocesan authorities had knowledge of these complaints before his ordination.

Fortune ministered in the village of Fethard-on-Sea in County Wexford, in Belfast and in Dundalk. Allegations of abuse were made against him in all three places. Fortune would take groups of boys to stay over in Loftus Hall in the early 1980s when it was a convent, and allegedly carried out some of his attacks there. Sean Cloney compiled a dossier of complaints against him. Fr. Fortune also set up a business in Dublin which offered media and journalism training to the public.

On 13 March 1999, he committed suicide in New Ross while awaiting trial for 66 charges of sexual abuse against 29 boys. He had taken a lethal cocktail of drugs and alcohol and was found dead in bed by his housekeeper. He was 45. He had been remanded in custody pending trial but had been released days earlier.

In March 2002, the BBC broadcast Suing the Pope, a documentary detailing the activities of Fortune and the response of the Diocese of Ferns to his activities over the years. The Report of the Ferns Inquiry claims that two of Fortune's alleged victims have since died by suicide.

See also 
 Roman Catholic Church sex abuse scandal
 Roman Catholic priests accused of sex offenses
 Ferns Report, on sexual abuse in the Roman Catholic Diocese of Ferns, Ireland
 Crimen sollicitationis
 Sex Crimes and the Vatican (Panorama Documentary Episode)
 Colm O'Gorman - one of his victims

Further reading
Tom Mooney, All the Bishops' Men - Clerical Abuse in an Irish Diocese, Collins Press  also read'the boy who sued the pope by Colm O'Gorman

References

Sources 
 A Message from Heaven: The Life and Crimes of Father Sean Fortune - Alison O'Connor, 2000 -

External links 
Clerical child abuse, an Irish timeline
 Bleeding the Church

1954 births
1999 suicides
Catholic Church sexual abuse scandals in Ireland
20th-century Irish Roman Catholic priests
Drug-related suicides in the Republic of Ireland
People from Gorey
People educated at St Peter's College, Wexford
Violence against men in the United Kingdom
1999 deaths